DCMES may refer to:
Digital Circuit Multiplication Equipment
Dublin core